Nezvěstice is a municipality and village in Plzeň-City District in the Plzeň Region of the Czech Republic. It has about 1,500 inhabitants.

Administrative parts
Village of Olešná is an administrative part of Nezvěstice.

References

Villages in Plzeň-City District